The 1747 English cricket season was the fourth season following the earliest known codification of the Laws of Cricket.

Matches 
Details of 14 matches between significant teams have survived.

13 May – Addington & Croydon v Deptford & Greenwich – Duppas Hill, Croydon
 29 May and 9 June – Addington & Croydon v London – Duppas Hill, Croydon
1–2 June – London v Addington & Croydon – Artillery Ground
12 June – Dartford v London – Dartford Brent
15 June – London v Addington & Croydon – Artillery Ground
29 June – London v Dartford – Artillery Ground
2 July – Dartford v Hadlow – Dartford Brent
9 July – Long Robin's XI v William Hodsoll's XI – Artillery Ground
28 July – Tom Faulkner's XI v John Bowra's XI –  Kennington Common
17 August – London v Bromley & Ripley – Artillery Ground
20 August – Bromley & Ripley v London – Ripley Green
24 August – London v Hadlow – Artillery Ground
31 August – England XI v Kent – Artillery Ground
2 September – Kent v England XI – Bromley Common

The two games between Kent and England were due to be played at Bromley Common on 29 June and at the Artillery Ground on 1 July, but the source reports that both matches "are deferred on account of the gentlemen subscribers being engaged at several Elections", referring to the Parliamentary Election of 1747.

Single wicket matches
A single wicket cricket match between five players of Slindon against five of Dartford at the Artillery Ground on 6 July was the result of a challenge by Slindon, published in the Daily Advertiser on 29 June, to play "five of any parish in England, for their own Sum". The announcement advised interested parties: "If it is accepted of by any, they are desir'd to go to Mr Smith, who has Orders to make Stakes for them". Matches followed against Bromley on 8 July and Hadlow on 10 and 15 July at the same ground. Another game resulting from Slindon's five-a-side challenge. Details unknown.

In early August, two single wicket matches at the Artillery Ground which were organised by the 2nd Duke of Richmond and on 5 September a three-a-side game took place, again at the Artillery Ground, between teams led by Robert Colchin and Stephen Dingate.

Other events
According to Rowland Bowen, cricket was first played in New York this year. This is, however, doubted by Ian Maun, who states that "no contemporary record of cricket in New York is known before 1751".

First mentions

Clubs and teams
 Hadlow

Players
 John Bell (Dartford/Kent)
 Thomas Bell (Dartford/Kent)
 John Larkin (Hadlow/Kent)
 Robert Eures (Bexley/Kent)

Venues
 Ripley Green

References

Bibliography

Further reading
 
 
 
 

1747 in English cricket
English cricket seasons in the 18th century